W. M. Gains was the first head football coach for Washburn University in Topeka, Kansas, and he held that position for the 1894 season.  His overall coaching record at Washburn was 3 wins, 1 loss, and 0 ties. He ranks 30th at Washburn in terms of total wins.

Head coaching record

References

Year of birth missing
Year of death missing
Washburn Ichabods football coaches